Bodianus solatus, the sunburnt hogfish, is a species of wrasse native to tropical and warm temperate waters of Western Australia. It was formerly considered the western Australian form of the goldspot hogfish (Bodanius perdito).

References

Further reading
RANDALL, JOHN E., and BENJAMIN C. VICTOR. "Bodianus atrolumbus (Valenciennes 1839), a valid species of labrid fish from the southwest Indian Ocean."

External links

solatus
Taxa named by Martin F. Gomon
Fish described in 2006